The presidency of the Council of the European Union is responsible for the functioning of the Council of the European Union, which is the co-legislator of the EU legislature alongside the European Parliament. It rotates among the member states of the EU every six months. The presidency is not an individual, but rather the position is held by a national government. It is sometimes incorrectly referred to as the "president of the European Union". The presidency's function is to chair meetings of the council, determine its agendas, set a work programme and facilitate dialogue both at Council meetings and with other EU institutions. The presidency is currently, as of February 2023, held by Sweden.

Three successive presidencies are known as presidency trios. The current trio (2022–2023) is made up of France (January–June 2022), Czech Republic (July–December 2022) and Sweden (January–June 2023). The German presidency began the second cycle of presidencies, after the system was introduced in 2007.

History
When the council was established, its work was minimal and the presidency rotated between each of the then six members every six months. However, as the work load of the Council grew and the membership increased, the lack of coordination between each successive six-month presidency hindered the development of long-term priorities for the EU.

In order to rectify the lack of coordination, the idea of trio presidencies was put forward where groups of three successive presidencies cooperated on a common political program. This was implemented in 2007 and formally laid down in the EU treaties in 2009 by the Treaty of Lisbon.

Until 2009, the Presidency had assumed political responsibility in all areas of European integration and it played a vital role in brokering high-level political decisions.

The Treaty of Lisbon reduced the importance of the Presidency significantly by officially separating the European Council from the Council of the European Union. Simultaneously it split the foreign affairs Council configuration from the General Affairs configuration and created the position of High Representative of the Union for Foreign Affairs and Security Policy.

After the United Kingdom's vote to leave the European Union in 2016 and its subsequent relinquishment of its scheduled presidency in the Council of the European Union which was due to take place from July to December 2017, the rotation of presidencies was brought six months forward. Estonia was scheduled to take over the UK's six-month slot instead. The presidency is currently (as of January 2023) held by Sweden.

Functioning

The Council meets in various formations where its composition depends on the topic discussed. For example, the Agriculture Council is composed of the national ministers responsible for Agriculture.

The primary responsibility of the Presidency is to organise and chair all meetings of the council, apart from the Foreign Affairs Council which is chaired by the High Representative. So, for instance, the Minister of Agriculture for the state holding the presidency chairs the Agriculture council. This role includes working out compromises capable of resolving difficulties.

Article 16(9) of the Treaty on European Union provides:

Each three successive presidencies cooperate on a "triple-shared presidency" work together over an 18-month period to accomplish a common agenda by the current president simply continuing the work of the previous "lead-president" after the end of his/her term. This ensures more consistency in comparison to a usual single six-month presidency and each three includes a new member state. This allows new member states to hold the presidency sooner and helps old member states pass their experience to the new members.

The role of the rotating Council Presidency includes:
 agenda-setting powers: in its 6-month programme, it decides on the order to discuss propositions, after they have been submitted by the Commission in its agenda monopoly powers
 brokering inter-institutional compromise: Formal Trilogue meetings between Commission, Parliament and Council are held to reach early consensus in the codecision legislative procedure; the Presidency takes part to the Conciliation Committee between Parliament and Council in the third stage of the codecision legislative procedure
 coordinating national policies and brokering compromise between member states in the council ("confessional system")
 management and administration of the council, external and internal representation

Holding the rotating Council Presidency includes both advantages and disadvantages for member states;
The opportunities include:
 member states have the possibility to show their negotiating skills, as "honest brokers", thus gaining influence and prestige
 member states gain a privileged access to information: at the end of their term, they know member states' preferences better than anyone else
 the Council programme may enable member states to focus Council discussion on issues of particular national/regional interest (for example Finland and the Northern Dimension initiative)

The burdens include:
 lack of administrative capacities and experience, especially for small and new member states; the concept of trio/troika has been introduced to enable member states to share experiences and ensure coherence on an 18-months base
 expenses in time and money, needed to support the administrative machine
 not being able to push through their own interests, as the role of Council Presidency is seen as an impartial instance; member states trying to push for initiatives of their own national interest are likely to see them failing in the medium run (for example the French 2008 Presidency and the Union for the Mediterranean project), as they need consensus and do not have enough time to reach it. This element is particularly substantial: holding the presidency may be, on balance, a disadvantage for member states

List of rotations

See also
 List of presidents of the institutions of the European Union
 President of the European Parliament
 President of the European Council
 President of the European Commission
 President of the European Union
 Council of the European Union

Notes

References

External links
 Presidency of the Council of the European Union
 Logos of the Council Presidencies EuroEsprit.org
 Council Decision of 1 January 2007 determining the order in which the office of President of the Council shall be held (2007/5/EC, Euratom) Official Journal of the European Union
 Implications of the Polish Presidency of the EU for Europe and Transatlantic Affairs, lecture by Maciej Pisarski (Deputy Chief of Mission of the Embassy of the Republic of Poland in Washington, DC), delivered at the University of Illinois, 2 December 2011; European Union Center at the University of Illinois 
 Cyprus takes over EU presidency amid doubts The Guardian, 4 July 2012

 
Council of the European Union
European Union-related lists
Political offices of the European Union